Tomás Patricio Charles (born 12 June 1985) is a retired Argentine footballer.

External links
 Profile at BDFA 
 

1985 births
Living people
Argentine footballers
Argentine expatriate footballers
Club Atlético Independiente footballers
Racing Club de Montevideo players
Nyíregyháza Spartacus FC players
C.F. Mérida footballers
La Piedad footballers
Instituto footballers
Unión La Calera footballers
Deportes Iquique footballers
Venados F.C. players
Cafetaleros de Chiapas footballers
Club Almagro players
Boca Unidos footballers
Deportes Temuco footballers
Argentino de Quilmes players
Chilean Primera División players
Uruguayan Primera División players
Ascenso MX players
Primera Nacional players
Primera B Metropolitana players
Argentine expatriate sportspeople in Chile
Expatriate footballers in Chile
Argentine expatriate sportspeople in Mexico
Expatriate footballers in Mexico
Argentine expatriate sportspeople in Uruguay
Expatriate footballers in Uruguay
Argentine expatriate sportspeople in Hungary
Expatriate footballers in Hungary
Association football defenders
Footballers from Buenos Aires